Albion was launched at Topsham, Devon, in 1800. She spent most of her career sailing between London and Jamaica. After 1814 she held a license from the British East India Company to trade with India, but she does not appear to have availed herself of the option. In 1814 the American privateer Brutus captured Albion, but the British recaptured her within a few days. She was condemned at Charleston, South Carolina, and broken up in 1816.

Career
Albion first appears in Lloyd's Register in 1800.

Capture and recapture
On 25 December 1814, towards the end of the War of 1812, the American privateer schooner Brutus captured Albion, "Skoulding", master, off the coast of Ireland as Albion was sailing to Bermuda from England. Brutus was armed with 12 guns and had a crew of 120 men. Even so, Albion resisted for some two hours.

Brutus, of Boston, was under the command of Captain William Austin. American records indicate that at the time of capture Albion, of 350 tons, was armed with eight guns and had a crew of 15 men. Her captors estimated the value of Albions cargo at $200,000. Austin put a prize crew on board her and sent her to America.

Fate
As Albion was sailing from Jamaica to London, Curry had to put into Havana on 18 October, having sprung a leak. She landed and sold 70 hogsheads of sugar. She was expected to sail again on 18 November.  

Curry did not get far. Albion put into Charleston in some distress. At Charleston the surveyors condemned her as unseaworthy. She was sold on 11 January 1816 for breaking up.

Citations and references
Citations

References

 

1800 ships
Age of Sail merchant ships
Merchant ships of the United Kingdom
Captured ships
Maritime incidents in 1816